Standard Liège lost just one match all league season, winning the Belgian First Division for the ninth time in club history. The season marked the breakthrough of teenage midfield duo Marouane Fellaini and Steven Defour, while strikers Milan Jovanović and Dieumerci Mbokani were right up there in terms of the top scoring charts of the domestic top division. The UEFA Cup run ended early, being knocked out to eventual winners Zenit Saint Petersburg in the last qualifying round.

Squad

Goalkeepers
  Olivier Renard
  Jérémy De Vriendt
  Rorys Aragón

Defenders
  Thomas Phibel
  Mohamed Sarr
  Frédéric Dupré
  Oguchi Onyewu
  Eric Deflandre
  Fred
  Landry Mulemo
  Marco Ingrao
  Dante

Midfielders
  Réginal Goreux
  Grégory Dufer
  Jonathan Walasiak
  Axel Witsel
  Steven Defour (C)
  Salim Tuama
  Siramana Dembélé
  Marouane Fellaini
  Vittorio Villano
  Yanis Papassarantis

Attackers
  Milan Jovanović
  Ali Lukunku
  Dieumerci Mbokani
  Igor de Camargo

First Division

Matches

Top scorers
  Milan Jovanović – 16
  Dieumerci Mbokani – 15
  Marouane Fellaini – 7
  Igor de Camargo – 7

Sources
   Standard de Liège - Soccerway

Standard Liège seasons
Liege
Belgian football championship-winning seasons